The 2016 season was Pahang Football Club's first season in the Malaysia Super League after rebranding their name from Pahang FA. The club's first league match was played on 13 February 2016.

Players

First team squad

Competitions

Super League

FA Cup

Malaysia Cup

Group stage

Transfers

In

Out

References

Sri Pahang FC
Sri Pahang FC seasons
2016 in Malaysian football
Malaysian football clubs 2016 season